is Becky♪♯'s debut album. It was released on February 24, 2010. For the months of March and April 2010, Becky was on tour to promote this album. The album comes as a "special price" edition; a standard edition with a special photo booklet; and a deluxe edition with the photo booklet, a mini-scrunchie designed by Becky, and a postcard to mail in for information on the live tour Becky is performing for the album. Her favorite songs off of the album are "Yami o Tsukinukete Yuku" and "Toki no Naka ni".

Kokoro no Hoshi debuted at #12 on the weekly Oricon albums chart, selling 11,802 copies in its first week.

Track listing

Charts and sales

References

External links
 

2010 debut albums
Becky (television personality) albums